Robert Mumford Smock (October 21, 1908 – April 22, 1986) was an American scientist and a professor at Cornell University. Known for his research for over two decades in the field of controlled atmosphere, which led to the use of controlled atmosphere rooms in the United States in the 1950s and later throughout the world. The method he developed made it possible to extend the shelf life of fruits, especially apples throughout the year.

Biography 
Smock was born in 1908 in Erie, Pennsylvania, to his father Grant Hibberd Smock, a dentist and his mother Frances Gibson Smock, a housewife the fifth of six brothers and sisters. He grew up on a farm and wanted to become a farmer. Smock studied agriculture in college and then went on to study for a doctorate at the University of California, Davis. Soon after he accepted a position at Cornell University where he led a career of over fifty years as a researcher in the field of pomology (study of fruits).

Career 
Professor Smock had a huge influence on the growing, storage and consumption of apples throughout the United States and the entire world. His first studies were in the context of applying wax to apples and its effects.

Controlled atmosphere 
From the late 1930s to the late 1950s, Smock studied the field of controlled atmosphere as part of his work at Cornell University. Smock researched techniques for using fruit after the harvest, especially apples, peaches, and plums. In his research, he tried to find a way to extend the shelf life of these fruits. In the late 1930s Smock visited the University of Cambridge in England to meet with researchers Franklin Kidd and Cyril West and to examine their research in the field of controlled atmosphere. After his visit, he returned to New York and began to engage in in-depth research in the field. He brought what he learned back to New York and adopted the controlled atmosphere technology for local apple varieties in the United States, mainly the McIintosh apple. Smock's laboratory was located in the wet basement of an old barn near the university where he conducted experiments in which he placed different types of apples in rooms with different temperatures and different combinations of oxygen and carbon dioxide in order to test their effect on the fruits. As a result of Smock's research, the first controlled atmosphere rooms were established in New York in the 1950s and allowed apple consumption to extend from the summer when the apples are picked to the following spring, throughout the United States.

The method of controlled atmosphere arrived to the United States and Canada in the 1950s and was used mainly for storing apples. In the mid-1950s, trucks began to be used to collect fruits and vegetables, which made it possible to grow and collect much larger quantities of fruits. This led to the need to preserve the fruits and then large storage rooms with controlled atmosphere began to be used throughout the United States. The controlled atmosphere method at this stage was extended throughout the world.

Smock developed recommendations for temperature, oxygen levels, and carbon dioxide levels that were used by all apple growers in the United States. The recommendations established back in the 1950s have been used for many years by apple growers in the United States and all over the world. In addition to developing these recommendations, he worked directly with fruit growers in order to determine recommendations regarding the structure of the controlled atmosphere rooms, the sealing of the building, measuring devices for the amount of oxygen and carbon dioxide in the rooms, and more. The growth in the commercial use of controlled atmosphere in New York and New England that formed the basis for growth in the rest of the United States can be directly attributed to the research of Robert Smock.

Preventing scald in apples 
Apples in storage tend to turn brown. To this day it is not clear what the source of the problem is, but it is known that it is caused by problematic and incorrect storage. This caused losses of millions of dollars every year to the apple growers of the world until Smock discovered that Diphenylamine and Ethoxyquin used immediately after picking prevented the problem. He researched for several years the combinations between the two materials until he discovered the ideal combination between them that gave a practical solution to the storage problems.

Smock was active in the United States Department of Agriculture in order to approve the use of these substances by the FDA. He collaborated with commercial chemists to develop a suitable formula. In addition, he worked on the development of equipment used by farmers in order to put these materials in the most appropriate way on the apples immediately after picking.

Smock's later studies dealt with minerals and how they affect the quality of apples.

Personal life 
Smock was married to Martha Smock and was a father of three children. He died in 1986 at the age of 77 in Ithaca, New York.

Award 

 L. M. Ware Award for Distinguished Teaching (1964) from the American Society for Horticultural Science.

Book 

 Apples and Apple Products - 1950 - Robert Mumford Smock, Alfred Max Neubert

Articles 

 1935 Some Physiological Studies with Calcium Cyanamide and Certain of Its Decomposition Products
 The Influence of Stored Apples on the Ripening of Other Apples Stored with Them Robert Mumford Smock Cornell University Agricultural Experiment Station, 1943 - Agriculture - 36 pages
 Studies on Storage Scald of Apples Robert Mumford Smock Cornell University Agricultural Experiment Station, 1945 - Agriculture - 29 pages
 Air Purification in the Apple Storage Robert Mumford Smock, Franklin Wallburg Southwick Cornell University Agricultural Experiment Station, 1948 - Air - 52 pages
 Studies on Respiration of Apples Robert Mumford Smock, Cecil Robert Gross Cornell University Agricultural Experiment Station, 1950 - Apples - 47 pages
 [1954] Effect of fungicides on McIntosh apple yield and quality Palmiter, D. H. (Deforest Harold); Smock, R. M. (Robert Mumford) - New York State Agricultural Experiment Station
 Methods of Scald Control on the Apple Robert Mumford Smock Cornell University Agricultural Experiment Station, New York State College of Agriculture, 1961 - Agriculture - 55 pages

References List 

1908 births
American scientists
1986 deaths
Cornell University faculty
University of California, Davis alumni